Michael Henry Wall (January 26, 1899 – December 25, 1970) was a Massachusetts politician who served as a member, and president of the city council, and as the 46th mayor of Lynn, Massachusetts.

Early life
Wall was born on Blossom Street, in Lynn's "Brickyard" section.
In 1919 he married Theresa Rich, and he was a graduate of St. Mary's Boys High School.  Wall worked from 1917 to 1942 as a machinist for the General Electric Company.

Wall was the treasurer and assistant business manager of Local 201.

Public service career

Lynn City Council
Wall entered politics in 1938 and was elected as city councilor from Ward Five to the city council. and he served in that capacity from 1939 until 1953.  In 1957 Wall was elected as an at-large city councilor and in 1961 he was re-elected. Wall was elected as president of the Lynn City Council.

Mayor of Lynn
In 1961 Mayor Thomas P. Costin Jr. became the postmaster of Lynn, Costin resigned the mayor's office on July 3, 1961, and pursuant to the city charter, as president of the city council,  Wall succeeded Costin as mayor. On November 7, 1961, Wall was elected mayor in his own right.  Running unopposed, Wall was re-elected on November 5, 1963.

Death
He died on December 25, 1970.

References

1899 births
1970 deaths
Massachusetts city council members
Mayors of Lynn, Massachusetts
20th-century American politicians